The men's 50 kilometre classical mass start event at the FIS Nordic World Ski Championships 2007 took place on 4 March 2007 at the Shirahatayama Open Stadium.

Results

References

External links
Final results International Ski Federation (FIS)

FIS Nordic World Ski Championships 2007